The Kayanians (also Kays, Kayanids or Kaianids, or Kiani) are a semi-mythological dynasty of Persian tradition and folklore which supposedly ruled after the Pishdadids. Considered collectively, the Kayanian kings are the heroes of the Avesta, the sacred texts of Zoroastrianism, and of the Shahnameh, Iran's national epic.

As an epithet of kings and the reason the dynasty is so called, Middle 𐭪𐭣 and New Persian kay(an) originates from Avestan 𐬐𐬀𐬎𐬎𐬌 kavi (or kauui) "king" and also "poet-sacrificer" or "poet-priest". The word is also etymologically related to the Avestan notion of kavaēm kharēno, the "divine royal glory" that the Kayanian kings were said to hold. The Kiani Crown is a physical manifestation of that belief.

Kiani is the surname of the following people:
Aquila Berlas Kiani (1921–2012), Pakistani educator 
Hadiqa Kiani, Pakistani singer-songwriter, sister of Irfan
Hossein Kiani (born 1992), Iranian football midfielder 
Iman Kiani (born 1988), Iranian football player
Jalal Kiani (born 1989), Iranian handball player
Jamshed Gulzar Kiani (1944–2008), Pakistan intelligence officer
Joe Kiani (born 1965),  Iranian-born American entrepreneur 
M. Z. Kiani (1910–?), an officer of the British Indian Army
Majid Kiani, Iranian musician and researcher
Mary Kiani (born 1969), Scottish singer
 Mehdi Kiani (footballer, born 1987), Iranian footballer
 Mehdi Kiani (footballer, born 1978), Iranian footballer